Martin Štrba may refer to:
 Martin Štrba (cinematographer)
 Martin Štrba (ice hockey)